John Frederick Ebersole (April 4, 1944 – November 23, 2016) was an American educator, author, columnist, and president of Excelsior College. He served as president from 2006 to 2016, succeeding C. Wayne Williams, the founding president of the college.

Experience and education 
Ebersole's career as an educator began at John F. Kennedy University. He eventually held positions at the University of California, Berkeley, Colorado State University, and Boston University, where he developed "BU Global". He also held a Sandler Fellowship at Harvard University's Kennedy School of Government.

Ebersole chaired the American Association of Community Colleges' Corporate Council and served on the board of directors of the Presidents' Forum. He holds a Doctor of Law and Policy degree from Northeastern University.

Military career 
Ebersole, a Vietnam War veteran, served in the U.S. Coast Guard from 1962-1983, achieving the rank of Commander (O-5) and receiving numerous military decorations, including two Bronze Stars. He held three commanding officer positions, including  (Charleston, South Carolina, 1968-1969),  (Cat Lo, Republic of Vietnam, 1969-1970), and, Pacific Area Training Team (Alameda, California, 1979-1981).

Awards and recognitions 
In 2009, Ebersole was awarded the Secretary of the Army Public Service Award. On May 6, 2014, Ebersole was inducted into the United States Distance Learning Association Hall of Fame.

References

1944 births
2016 deaths
United States Coast Guard personnel of the Vietnam War
Heads of universities and colleges in the United States
People from Warrensburg, Missouri
United States Coast Guard officers